Natividad Macho Álvarez (13 December 1928 – 20 August 2017), known by the stage name Nati Mistral, was a Spanish actress and singer. She won the National Theater Prize in 1997.

Selected filmography
The Captain's Ship (1947)
Gold and Ivory (1947)
Currito of the Cross (1949)
Service at Sea (1951)
Cabaret (1953)
Lovers of Toledo (1953)
My Street (1960)
Mis tres amores (1971)

Stage roles
Te espero en el Eslava (1957–1958)
Ven y ven...al Eslava (1958–1959)
El amor brujo (1966)
Man of La Mancha (1966; 1969–1970)
Anillos para una dama (1976)
Azabache (1992)
Afectos compartidos (2005)

References

External links

1928 births
2017 deaths
Spanish film actresses
Spanish stage actresses
Actresses from Madrid
Singers from Madrid
20th-century Spanish actresses
21st-century Spanish actresses
Spanish telenovela actresses
20th-century Spanish singers
21st-century Spanish singers
20th-century Spanish women singers
21st-century Spanish women singers